is a Japanese football player who plays as a goalkeeper for J2 League club Blaublitz Akita.

Club statistics
Updated to 14 December 2022.

References

External links
Profile at Renofa Yamaguchi
Profile at Kyoto Sanga

1994 births
Living people
People from Nakatsugawa, Gifu
Association football people from Gifu Prefecture
Japanese footballers
J2 League players
J3 League players
Kyoto Sanga FC players
Renofa Yamaguchi FC players
J.League U-22 Selection players
Kataller Toyama players
Blaublitz Akita players
Association football goalkeepers